The Consolidated PBY Catalina is a flying boat and amphibious aircraft that was produced in the 1930s and 1940s. In Canadian service it was known as the Canso. It was one of the most widely used seaplanes of World War II. Catalinas served with every branch of the United States Armed Forces and in the air forces and navies of many other nations.  The last military PBYs served until the 1980s. As of 2021, 86 years after its first flight, the aircraft continues to fly as a waterbomber (or airtanker) in aerial firefighting operations in some parts of the world. None remain in military service.

Design and development

Background 
The PBY was originally designed to be a patrol bomber, an aircraft with a long operational range intended to locate and attack enemy transport ships at sea in order to disrupt enemy supply lines. With a mind to a potential conflict in the Pacific Ocean, where troops would require resupply over great distances, the U.S. Navy in the 1930s invested millions of dollars in developing long-range flying boats for this purpose. Flying boats had the advantage of not requiring runways, in effect having the entire ocean available.

Initial development 
As American dominance in the Pacific Ocean began to face competition from Japan in the 1930s, the U.S. Navy contracted Consolidated, Martin and Douglas in October 1933 to build competing prototypes for a patrol flying boat. Naval doctrine of the 1930s and 1940s used flying boats in a wide variety of roles that today are handled by multiple special-purpose aircraft. The U.S. Navy had adopted the Consolidated P2Y and Martin P3M models for this role in 1931, but both aircraft were underpowered and hampered by inadequate range and limited payloads.

Consolidated and Douglas both delivered single prototypes of their new designs, the XP3Y-1 and XP3D-1, respectively. Consolidated's XP3Y-1 was an evolution of the XPY-1 design that had originally competed unsuccessfully for the P3M contract two years earlier and of the XP2Y design that the Navy had authorized for a limited production run. Although the Douglas aircraft was a good design, the Navy opted for Consolidated's because the projected cost was only $90,000 per aircraft.

Consolidated's XP3Y-1 design (company Model 28) had a parasol wing with external bracing struts, mounted on a pylon over the fuselage. Wingtip stabilizing floats were retractable in flight to form streamlined wingtips and had been licensed from the Saunders-Roe company. The two-step hull design was similar to that of the P2Y, but the Model 28 had a cantilever cruciform tail unit instead of a strut-braced twin tail. Cleaner aerodynamics gave the Model 28 better performance than earlier designs. Construction is all-metal, stressed-skin, of aluminum sheet, except the ailerons and wing trailing edge, which are fabric covered.

The prototype was powered by two  Pratt & Whitney R-1830-54 Twin Wasp radial engines mounted on the wing's leading edge.

The XP3Y-1 had its maiden flight on 21 March 1935, after which it was transferred to the U.S. Navy for service trials. The XP3Y-1 was a significant performance improvement over previous patrol flying boats. The Navy requested further development in order to bring the aircraft into the category of patrol bomber, and in October 1935, the prototype was returned to Consolidated for further work, including installation of  R-1830-64 engines. For the redesignated XPBY-1, Consolidated introduced redesigned vertical tail surfaces which resolved a problem with the tail becoming submerged on takeoff, which had made lift-off impossible under some conditions.

The XPBY-1 was delivered to VP-11F in October 1936. The second squadron to be equipped was VP-12, which received the first of its aircraft in early 1937. The second production order was placed on 25 July 1936. Over the next three years, the design was gradually developed further and successive models introduced.

The aircraft eventually bore the name Catalina after Santa Catalina Island, California; the name was coined in November 1941, as Great Britain ordered their first 30 aircraft.

PBN Nomad 
The Naval Aircraft Factory made significant modifications to the PBY design, many of which would have significantly interrupted deliveries had they been incorporated on the Consolidated production lines. The new aircraft, officially known as the PBN-1 Nomad, had several differences from the basic PBY. The most obvious upgrades were to the bow, which was sharpened and extended by two feet, and to the tail, which was enlarged and featured a new shape. Other improvements included larger fuel tanks, increasing range by 50%, and stronger wings permitting a 2,000 lb (908 kg) increase in gross takeoff weight. An auxiliary power unit was installed, along with an improved electrical system, and the weapons were upgraded with continuous-feed mechanisms.

138 of the 156 PBN-1s produced served with the Soviet Navy, after the NAF transferred ownership via Project ZEBRA (1944-1945). The remaining 18 were assigned to training units at NAS Whidbey Island and the Naval Air Facility in Newport, Rhode Island. Later, improvements found in the PBN such as the larger tail were incorporated into the amphibious PBY-6A.

Naming 
The designation "PBY" was determined in accordance with the U.S. Navy aircraft designation system of 1922; PB representing "Patrol Bomber" and Y being the code assigned to Consolidated Aircraft as its manufacturer. Catalinas built by other manufacturers for the U.S. Navy were designated according to different manufacturer codes, thus Canadian Vickers-built examples were designated PBV, Boeing Canada examples PB2B (there already being a Boeing PBB) and Naval Aircraft Factory examples were designated PBN. In accordance with contemporary British naming practice of naming seaplanes after coastal port towns, Royal Canadian Air Force examples were named Canso, for the town of that name in Nova Scotia. The Royal Air Force used the name Catalina and the U.S. Navy adopted this name in 1942. The United States Army Air Forces and later the United States Air Force used the designation OA-10. U.S. Navy Catalinas used in the Pacific against the Japanese for night operations were painted black overall; as a result these aircraft were sometimes referred to locally as "Black Cats".

Operational history

Roles in World War II 
The PBY was the most numerous aircraft of its kind, with around 3,300 aircraft built.

During World War II, PBYs were used in anti-submarine warfare, patrol bombing, convoy escort, search and rescue missions (especially air-sea rescue), and cargo transport.

The type operated in nearly all operational theatres of World War II. The Catalina served with distinction and played a prominent and invaluable role in the war against Japan.

These patrol planes shared with land based patrol bombers the combat roles while the very long range Consolidated LB-30 and the Consolidated Coronado were pressed into service to increase the all important logistic strategic air lift capability in the vast Pacific theater. The pairings allowed the Catalina to take on the role of eyes of the fleets at longer ranges than the float plane scouts.

Several different flying boats were adopted by the Navy, but the PBY was the most widely used and produced.

Although the Catalina was slow and ungainly, Allied forces used the aircraft in a wide variety of roles for which  it was never intended. PBYs are remembered for their rescue role, in which they saved the lives of hundreds of aircrew downed over water. Catalina airmen called their aircraft the "Cat" on combat missions and "Dumbo" in air-sea rescue service.

The Catalina scored the U.S. Navy's first credited air-to-air "kill" of a Japanese airplane in the Pacific War. On 10 December 1941, the Japanese attacked the Cavite Navy Yard in the Philippines. Numerous U.S. ships and submarines were damaged or destroyed by bombs and bomb fragments. While flying to safety during the raid on Cavite, Lieutenant Harmon T. Utter's PBY was attacked by three Japanese Mitsubishi A6M2 Type 0 carrier fighters. Chief Boatswain Earl D. Payne, Utter's bow gunner, shot down one, thus scoring the U.S. Navy's first kill. Utter, as a commander, later coordinated the carrier air strikes that led to the destruction of the Japanese battleship Yamato.

The Catalina performed one of the first offensive operations against the Japanese by the US. On 27 December 1941, six Catalinas of Patrol Squadron 101 bombed Japanese shipping at Jolo Island against heavy fighter opposition, with four Catalinas lost.

Anti-submarine warfare 
Catalinas were the most extensively used anti-submarine warfare (ASW) aircraft in both the Atlantic and Pacific theaters of World War II, and were also used in the Indian Ocean, flying from the Seychelles and from Ceylon. Their duties included escorting convoys to Murmansk. By 1943, U-boats were well-armed with anti-aircraft guns and two Victoria Crosses were won by Catalina pilots pressing home their attacks on U-boats in the face of heavy fire: Flying Officer John Cruickshank of the RAF, in 1944, received the award for sinking U-347 (although the submarine is now known to have been U-361) and in the same year Flight Lieutenant David Hornell of the Royal Canadian Air Force received the decoration posthumously for the sinking of  U-1225. Catalinas destroyed 40 U-boats, but not without losses of their own. A Brazilian Catalina attacked and sank U-199 in Brazilian waters on 31 July 1943. Later, the aircraft was baptized as "Arará", in memory of the merchant ship of that name which was sunk by another U-boat.

Maritime patrol 

In their role as patrol aircraft, Catalinas participated in some of the most notable naval engagements of World War II. The aircraft's parasol wing and large waist blisters provided excellent visibility and combined with its long range and endurance, made it well suited for the task.

This sighting eventually led to the destruction of the German battleship.

On 7 December 1941, before the Japanese amphibious landings on Kota Bharu, Malaya, their invasion force was approached by a Catalina flying boat of No. 205 Squadron RAF. The aircraft was shot down by five Nakajima Ki-27 fighters before it could radio its report to air headquarters in Singapore. Flying Officer Patrick Bedell, commanding the Catalina, and his seven crew members became the first Allied casualties in the war with Japan. Patrol Wing 10 of the U.S. Asiatic Fleet had 44 Catalinas under its command but lost 41 within 90 days. Patrol Wing 10 also lost its main seaplane tender, USS Langley, to Japanese aircraft during the Dutch East Indies Campaign while it was transporting 32 Curtiss P-40 Warhawk fighter planes.

A flight of Catalinas spotted the Japanese fleet approaching Midway Island, beginning the Battle of Midway.

A Royal Canadian Air Force (RCAF) Canso flown by Squadron Leader L.J. Birchall foiled Japanese plans to destroy the Royal Navy's Indian Ocean fleet on 4 April 1942 when it detected the Japanese carrier fleet approaching Ceylon (Sri Lanka).

Night attack and naval interdiction 
During the Battle of Midway four United States Navy PBYs of Patrol Squadrons 24 and 51 made a night torpedo attack on the Japanese fleet on the night of 3–4 June 1942, scoring one hit which damaged the fleet oiler Akebono Maru, the only successful American torpedo attack in the entire battle.

During the Guadalcanal campaign, some U.S. Navy PBYs were painted matte black and sent on night bombing, torpedoing, and strafing missions against Japanese supply vessels and warships, including conducting interdiction raids on the Tokyo Express. These PBYs were later called "Black Cats". Subsequently, special squadrons of Black Cats were formed, commencing in December 1942 with VP-12, with an additional thirteen squadrons coming into service thereafter. Flying slowly at night, dipping to ship mast height, the Black Cats bombed, strafed, and torpedoed all kinds of Japanese vessels, sinking or damaging thousands of tons of shipping. The Black Cats also performed bombing, strafing and harassment regarding land based Japanese installations, as well as conducting reconnaissance and search and rescue operations. The Black Cat squadrons continued to be active into 1944 with the  PB4Y-2 beginning to come in service in greater numbers and replacing the PBYs, the last Black Cat squadrons returning to the U.S. in early 1945.

The Royal Australian Air Force (RAAF) also operated Catalinas as night raiders, with four squadrons Nos. 11, 20, 42, and 43 laying mines from 23 April 1943 until July 1945 in the southwest Pacific deep in Japanese-held waters, bottling up ports and shipping routes and forcing ships into deeper waters to become targets for U.S. submarines; they tied up the major strategic ports such as Balikpapan which shipped 80% of Japanese oil supplies. Operations included trapping the Japanese fleet in Manila Bay in assistance of General Douglas MacArthur's landing at Mindoro in the Philippines. Australian Catalinas also operated out of Jinamoc in the Leyte Gulf, and mined ports on the Chinese coast from Hong Kong to as far north as Wenchow. Both USN and RAAF Catalinas regularly mounted nuisance night bombing raids on Japanese bases, with the RAAF claiming the slogan "The First and the Furthest". Targets of these raids included a major base at Rabaul. RAAF aircrews, like their U.S. Navy counterparts, employed "terror bombs", ranging from scrap metal and rocks to empty beer bottles with razor blades inserted into the necks, to produce high-pitched screams as they fell, keeping Japanese soldiers awake and scrambling for cover. There was a Catalina base on Drimmie Head on the Gove Peninsula in the Northern Territory.

Search and rescue 

Catalinas were employed by every branch of the U.S. military as rescue aircraft. A PBY piloted by LCDR Adrian Marks (USN) rescued 56 sailors in high seas from the heavy cruiser  after the ship was sunk during World War II. When there was no more room inside, the crew tied sailors to the wings. The aircraft could not fly in this state; instead it acted as a lifeboat, protecting the sailors from exposure and the risk of shark attack, until rescue ships arrived. Catalinas continued to function in the search-and-rescue role for decades after the end of the war.

Early commercial use 

Catalinas were also used for commercial air travel. The longest commercial flights (in terms of time aloft) ever made in aviation history were the Qantas flights flown weekly from 29 June 1943 through July 1945 over the Indian Ocean, dubbed the Double Sunrise.

Post-World War II employment 

An Australian PBY named "Frigate Bird II", an ex RAAF aircraft, registered VH-ASA, made the first trans-Pacific flight across the South Pacific between Australia and Chile in 1951 by (Sir) Gordon Taylor, making numerous stops at islands along the way for refueling, meals, and overnight sleep of its crew, flown from Sydney to Quintero in Chile after making initial landfall at Valparaiso via Tahiti and Easter Island.  One of six ordered by the RAAF was used as part of the air route across the Pacific from Sydney to Valparaiso, is in the collection of the Museum of Applied Arts and Sciences in Sydney.

With the end of the war, all of the flying boat versions of the Catalina were quickly retired from the U.S. Navy, but the amphibious versions remained in service for some years. The last Catalina in U.S. service was a PBY-6A operating with a Naval Reserve squadron, which was retired from use on 3 January 1957. The Catalina subsequently equipped the world's smaller armed services into the late 1960s in fairly substantial numbers.

The U.S. Air Force's Strategic Air Command used Catalinas (designated OA-10s) in service as scout aircraft from 1946 through 1947.

The Brazilian Air Force flew Catalinas in naval air patrol missions against German submarines starting in 1943. The flying boats also carried out air mail deliveries. In 1948, a transport squadron was formed and equipped with PBY-5As converted to the role of amphibious transports. The 1st Air Transport Squadron (ETA-1) was based in the port city of Belem and flew Catalinas and C-47s until 1982. Catalinas were convenient for supplying military detachments scattered along the Amazon. They reached places that were otherwise accessible only by helicopters. The ETA-1 insignia was a winged turtle with the motto "Though slowly, I always get there". Today, the last Brazilian Catalina (a former RCAF one) is displayed at the Airspace Museum (MUSAL) in Rio de Janeiro.

Jacques-Yves Cousteau used a PBY-6A (N101CS) to support his diving expeditions. His second son, Philippe, was killed in an accident in this aircraft that occurred on the Tagus River near Lisbon. The Catalina nosed over during a high-speed taxi run undertaken to check the hull for leakage following a water landing. The aircraft turned upside down, causing the fuselage to break behind the cockpit. The wing separated from the fuselage and the left engine broke off, penetrating the captain's side of the cockpit.

Paul Mantz converted an unknown number of surplus Catalinas to flying yachts at his Orange County California hangar in the late 1940s and early 1950s.

A larger, squared-off rudder was installed to compensate for the increased yaw which the more powerful engines could generate. The Super Catalina also had extra cabin windows and other alterations.

Chilean Air Force (FACH) Captain Roberto Parragué, in his PBY Catalina FACH No. 405 called "Manu-Tara", which means Lucky Bird in the Rapanui language, undertook the first flight between Easter Island and the continent of South America (from Chile), as well as the first flight to Tahiti, making him a national hero of France as well as of Chile. The flight was authorized by the Chilean President in 1951, but a second flight he made in 1957 was not authorized, and he was dismissed from the Chilean Air Force.

Of the few dozen remaining airworthy Catalinas, the majority are in use as aerial firefighting aircraft.
China Airlines, the official airline of the Republic of China (Taiwan) was founded with two Catalina amphibians.

Platforms are folded out and deployed from Catalinas for use in open ocean fishing and Mahi Mahi tracking in the Pacific Ocean.

Catalina affair 

The Catalina Affair is the name given to a Cold War incident in which a Swedish Air Force search and rescue/maritime patrol aircraft Catalina (Swedish designation "TP 47") was shot down by Soviet MiG 15 fighters over the Baltic Sea in June 1952 while investigating the disappearance of a Swedish Douglas DC-3 (later found to have been shot down by Soviet MiG-15s while on a signals intelligence mission; it was found in 2003 and raised 2004–2005).

Variants 
An estimated 4,051 Catalinas, Cansos, and GSTs of all versions were produced between June 1937 and May 1945 for the U.S. Navy, the United States Army Air Forces, the United States Coast Guard, Allied nations, and civilian customers.

US Navy 
XP3Y-1
Prototype Model 28 flying boat later re-designated XPBY-1, one built (USN Bureau No. 9459). Later fitted with a  diameter ring to detonate magnetic sea mines. A  Ranger engine drove a generator to produce the magnetic field.

XPBY-1
Prototype version of the Model 28 for the United States Navy, a re-engined XP3Y-1 with two  R-1830-64 engines, one built.
PBY-1 (Model 28-1)
Initial production variant with two  R-1830-64 engines, 60 built.
PBY-2 (Model 28-2)
Equipment changes and improved performance, 50 built.
PBY-3 (Model 28-3)
Powered by two  R-1830-66 engines, 66 built.
PBY-4 (Model 28-4)
Powered by two  R-1830-72 engines, 33 built (including one initial as a XPBY-4 which later became the XPBY-5A).
 (Model 28-5)
Either two  R-1830-82 or −92 engines and provision for extra fuel tanks (with partial self-sealing protection). 683 built (plus one built at New Orleans), some aircraft to the RAF as the Catalina IVA and one to the United States Coast Guard. The PBY-5 was also built in the Soviet Union as the GST.
XPBY-5A
One PBY-4 converted into an amphibian and first flown in November 1939.

Amphibious version of the PBY-5 with two  R-1830-92 engines, first batch (of 124) had one  bow gun, the remainder had two bow guns; 803 built including diversions to the United States Army Air Forces, the RAF (as the Catalina IIIA) and one to the United States Coast Guard.
PBY-5R
The XPBY-5A converted into a staff transport, with amphibious gear and nose turret removed and additional windows added.

PBY-6A
Amphibious version with two  R-1830-92 engines and a taller fin and rudder. Radar scanner fitted above cockpit and two  nose guns; 175 built including 21 transferred to the Soviet Navy.
PBY-6AG
One PBY-6A used by the United States Coast Guard as a staff transport.
PB2B-1
Boeing Canada built PBY-5 flying boat for the RAF and RCAF from 1942. 240 built.
PB2B-1A
Boeing Canada built PBY-5A amphibious aircraft for the RCAF from 1943. 55 built.
PB2B-2
Boeing Canada version of the PBY-5 but with the taller PBN-1 fin. 67 built. Most to the RAF as the Catalina VI.
PBN-1 Nomad
Naval Aircraft Factory version of the PBY-5 with major modification including a  bow extension, modified hull lines and step, re-designed tip floats and tail surfaces and a revised electrical system. 155 were built for delivery to the RAF as the Catalina V although 138 were Lend-Leased to the Soviet Navy as the KM-1
PBV-1A
Canadian Vickers built version of the PBY-5A amphibious aircraft, 380 built including 150 to the Royal Canadian Air Force as the Canso "A" and the rest to the USAAF as the OA-10A.

United States Army Air Forces 

OA-10
USAAF designation for the PBY-5A (OA = observation/amphibian). 105 built (56 transferred from the US Navy). 58 suriving aircraft were redesignated to A-10 on 11 June 1948 (A = amphibian). Search and rescue versions were designated SA-10 (SA = search/amphibian).
OA-10A
USAAF designation for the PBV-1A. 230 transferred from the US Navy. Suriving aircraft were redesignated to A-10A on 11 June 1948. Search and rescue versions were designated SA-10A. Three additional aircraft were transferred from the US Navy in 1949 as SA-10As.
OA-10B
USAAF designation for the PBY-6A. 75 transferred from the US Navy. Suriving aircraft were redesignated to A-10B on 11 June 1948. Search and rescue versions were designated SA-10B.

Royal Air Force 

Catalina I
Direct purchase aircraft for the Royal Air Force, same as the PBY-5 with six  guns (one in bow, four in waist blisters and one aft of the hull step) and powered by two  R-1830-S1C3-G engines, 109 built.
Catalina IA
Operated by the Royal Canadian Air Force as the Canso, 14 built.
Catalina IB
Lend-lease PBY-5Bs for the RAF, 225 aircraft built.
Catalina II
Equipment changes, six built.
Catalina IIA
Vickers-Canada built Catalina II for the RAF, 50 built.
Catalina IIIA
Former U.S. Navy PBY-5As used by the RAF on the North Atlantic Ferry Service, 12 aircraft. These were the only amphibians that saw RAF service.
Catalina IVA
Lend-lease PBY-5s for the RAF, 93 aircraft.

Catalina IVB
Lend-lease PB2B-1s for the RAF, some to the Royal Australian Air Force.
Catalina VI
Lend-lease PB2B-2s for the RAF, some to the RAAF.

Royal Canadian Air Force 

Canso
PB2B-1 flying boats for the Royal Canadian Air Force (RCAF). 17 built.
Canso A
PBV-1A and PB2B-1A amphibious aircraft produced for the RCAF (A = amphibious). 150 PBV-1A and 55 PB2B-1A built.
Canso 2F
Canso A rebuilt as unarmed cargo aircraft (F = freight). Some fitted with Rebecca transponding radar for navigation and some aircraft are also carried LORAN.
Canso 2SR
Canso A rebuilt as unarmed search and rescue aircraft (SR = search/rescue). Some fitted with Rebecca transponding radar for navigation and some aircraft also carried LORAN.

Other users 
GST
Soviet designation for transport versions of the PBY-5 ("Gydro Samoliot Transportnyi" - transport seaplane).

TP 47
Swedish designation for three unarmed Canso A amphibious aircraft purchased by the Swedish air force in 1948 (TP = transport). These were modified with search radars in the nose turret during the early 1950s.
CA-10
In the 1950s several civilian Catalinas were converted as CA-10 cargo transport aircraft, the name being derived from the USAF A-10 (C = cargo).
Steward-Davis Super Catalina ("Super Cat")
Catalina converted to use  Wright R-2600 Cyclone 14 engines, with enlarged rudder and other changes.
Avalon Turbo Canso
A proposed turboprop conversion of Canso water bombers, powered by two Rolls-Royce Dart engines.

Production

Operators

Surviving aircraft

Specifications (PBY-5A)

See also 

 The crash in Norway during Project ZEBRA in 1944

References

Notes

Citations

Bibliography 
Bridgeman, Leonard. "The Consolidated Vultee Model 28 Catalina." Jane's Fighting Aircraft of World War II. London: Studio, 1946. .
Cacutt, Len, ed. "PBY Catalina: Ocean Patroller." Great Aircraft of the World. London: Marshall Cavendish, 1989. .
Creed, Roscoe. PBY: The Catalina Flying Boat. Annapolis, Maryland: US Naval Institute Press, 1986. .
Crocker, Mel. Black Cats and Dumbos: WW II's Fighting PBYs. Huntington Beach, California: Crocker Media Expressions, 2002. .
Dorny, Louis B. US Navy PBY Catalina Units of the Pacific War. Botley, Oxford, UK: Osprey Publishing, 2007. .

Gaunt, Coral and Robert Cleworth. Cats at War: Story of RAAF Catalinas in the Asia Pacific Theatre of War. Roseville, NSW Australia: J.R. Cleworth, 2000. .
Greenhous, Brereton  et al. The Crucible of War 1939–1945: The Official History of the Royal Canadian Air Force, Vol. III.  Toronto: University of Toronto Press, 1994. .

Hendrie, Andrew. Flying Cats: The Catalina Aircraft in World War II. Annapolis, Maryland: US Naval Institute Press, 1988. .
 Howard, Paul. French Pacific 'Cats': Flying-boat Services in the Pacific, 1946–1971. Air Enthusiast 111, May/June 2004, pp. 38–44. 

Kinzey, Bert. PBY Catalina in Detail & Scale. Carrollton, Texas: Squadron/Signal Publications, Inc., 2000. .
Knott, Richard C. Black Cat Raiders of World War II. Annapolis, Maryland: US Naval Institute Press, 2000. .
Legg, David. Consolidated PBY Catalina: The Peacetime Record. Annapolis, Maryland: US Naval Institute Press, 2002. .

Petrescu, FLorian Ion and Reilly Victoria Petrescu. The Aviation History. Stoughton, Wisconsin: Books on Demand, 2012. .

Ragnarsson, Ragnar. US Navy PBY Catalina Units of the Atlantic War. Botley, Oxford, UK: Osprey Publishing, 2006. .
Scarborough, William E. PBY Catalina in Action (Aircraft number 62). Carrollton, Texas: Squadron/Signal Publications, Inc., 1983. .
Scarborough, William E. PBY Catalina: Walk Around. Carrollton, Texas: Squadron/Signal Publications, Inc., 1996. .
Wagner, Ray. The Story of the PBY Catalina (Aero Biographies Volume 1). San Diego, California: Flight Classics, 1972. .
 Wegg, John. General Dynamics Aircraft and their Predecessors. London:Putnam, 1990. .

Further reading

External links 

PBY Catalina Foundation 
(1945) AN 01-5M-3 Handbook of Structural Repair for Navy Models PBY-5, PBY-5A, PBY-6A Army Model OA-10 Airplanes
 Catalina Aircraft Trust
 Popular Mechanics, February 1943, "Here Comes The Cats" very large and detailed article

PB1Y
Consolidated PB1Y
Flying boats
Amphibious aircraft
Parasol-wing aircraft
World War II patrol aircraft of the United States
PBN Nomad
Cruciform tail aircraft
Aircraft first flown in 1935
Twin piston-engined tractor aircraft